The systemic human rights abuses of the military dictatorship in Brazil (1964-1985) included extrajudicial killings, forced disappearances, torture, arbitrary detention, and severe restrictions on freedom of speech. Human Rights Watch has described the human rights abuses of the Military dictatorship in Brazil as crimes against humanity.

Institutional Act 5 of December 13, 1968, which suspended habeas corpus and constitutional protections and led to the institutionalization of torture as a tool by the state, brought on the worst period of state violence and repression. As James Petras argues, the military dictatorship's institutionalization of violence and systemic use of terror were fundamental to its short-lived "economic miracle."

Extrajudicial killings and forced disappearances 

The National Truth Commission recognized 434 political killings and forced disappearances between 1946 and 1988, most of which occurred during the military dictatorship (1964-1985).

Torture 

Brasil: Nunca Mais—a monumental report edited by Paulo Evaristo Arns published July 15, 1985, four months after the restoration of civilian rule—documented the extent and character of the military dictatorship's use of torture by analyzing hundreds of thousands of court testimonies and official documents.

Arbitrary detention 
An example of arbitrary detention under the military dictatorship was the detainment, torture, and forced disappearance of 70 members of the Communist Party of Brazil and peasants without investigation and the subsequent restriction of access to information for next of kin, in violation of Article 13 of the American Convention on Human Rights.

Censorship 
Zuenir Ventura estimates that in the period from December 13, 1968 to January 1, 1979 during which the AI-5 was in effect, "approximately 500 films, 450 theatrical plays, 200 books, dozens of radio programs, 100 magazines, over 500 song lyrics, and a dozen telenovela titles and pilots" were censored.

Mass grave 
The military dictatorship used Cemitério Dom Bosco as a clandestine mass grave where it buried the bodies of disappeared dissidents. In September 1990, an investigation supported by Luiza Erundina discovered a clandestine ditch with 1049 body bags containing skeletal remains, only five of which have been identified, including those of the trade unionist .

Legacy 
As of 2009, no Brazilian official had been charged for the human rights abuses committed during the military dictatorship.

Attempts at reconciliation 
In 2014, the National Truth Commission, a restorative justice body convened to study human rights abuses in Brazil, identified 377 state agents—about 200 of whom were still alive—as responsible for hundreds of cases of torture, assassinations, and secret disappearances during the military dictatorship. However, the  passed by the dictatorship August 28, 1979 has shielded all those guilty of torture from facing justice.

References 

Military dictatorship in Brazil
Human rights abuses in Brazil